State Route 821 (SR 821) is a north–south state highway in the southeastern portion of the U.S. state of Ohio. The route is entirely undivided surface road, and is much less direct than the newer I-77 which supplanted it as a through route. As the interstate was being built, the designation of US 21 was moved to the freeway before Ohio wholly decommissioned the now-superfluous U.S. route. SR 821 was designated about two years after US 21 was moved onto I-77 in southeastern Ohio.

Route description

Along its path, SR 821 passes through central portions of Washington County and Noble County, and into the southern part of Guernsey County.  No segment of the route is included as a part of the National Highway System (NHS).  The NHS is a network of highways identified as being most important for the economy, mobility and defense of the nation.

History
SR 821 was created in 1971.  The designation was applied to what was the former routing of US 21 between Marietta and Byesville, prior to the completion of I-77 through the area by 1969.  At the time, when the US 21 designation was removed from Ohio in favor of I-77, this stretch of roadway was removed from the state highway system.  However, by 1971, it was introduced back into the system, and was given the designation of SR 821, based on its routing along the old path of US 21.

Major intersections

See also

 List of state highways in Ohio

References

External links

821
821
821
821
U.S. Route 21